Archibald Orr Lang (circa 1880 – 10 July 1957) was a Scottish shipping businessman and unofficial member of the Executive Council and Legislative Council of Hong Kong.

Career
Lang arrived in Hong Kong in 1904 to join the Gibb, Livingston & Co. He became a partner of the company and also the Mackinnon, Mackenzie & Co. From 1916 to 1927, he was the head of the Gibb, Livingston & Co.

He served on the committee of the Hong Kong General Chamber of Commerce and became chairman in 1922 and vice-chairman in 1927. On 24 November 1921, Lang was elected by the Chamber to represent the business interest in the Legislative Council of Hong Kong during Sir Henry Pollock's absence. Since he had served on the Legislative Council on several occasions and on the Executive Council from 1922.

During his stay in Hong Kong, he was director of many public companies., including the Union Insurance Society of Canton, the Hong Kong and Kowloon Wharf and Godown Company, the Indo-China Steam Navigation Company, the China Sugar Refining Company, the Hong Kong, Canton, and Macao Steamboat Company and the Peak Tramways Company. He was also a director on the board of the Hongkong and Shanghai Banking Corporation and chairman of the bank in 1923. He left Hong Kong in April 1927 for London and his farewell gathering was attended by Governor Cecil Clementi.

In December 1927, A. O. Lang was appointed assistant manager of the Peninsular and Oriental Steam Navigation Company, one of the biggest British shipping companies, in succession to A. C. Symes on retirement. He was subsequently appointed the board of the P & O Company with Sir Harcourt Butler after the death of Lord Inchcape and Lord Kilbracken.

He was also the chairman of the Far Eastern Conference, a conference for all shipping companies in the Far East, from 1927 to 1938. He resigned after being appointed deputy chairman of the P. & O. Company in 1939. At the time he also held the post of deputy chairman of the B. I. Company. Lang continued to become managing director and deputy chairman of the P. & O. Company during the Second World War.

Family and death
He married Ellen Margaret Love in 1910 in Hong Kong. Their daughter, Shelia Macnaughton Lang, was born in Hong Kong in 1913.  Their son, William Macnaughton Lang, was born in Hong Kong in 1918 and also worked for P & O in London for many years. Beverley Lang, Mrs Justice Lang, an English High Court judge, is his granddaughter.

A.O. Lang died on 10 July 1957 at the age of 77.

References

1880s births
1957 deaths
Scottish businesspeople in shipping
Hong Kong shipping businesspeople
Hong Kong people of Scottish descent
Scottish expatriates in Hong Kong
Members of the Executive Council of Hong Kong
Members of the Legislative Council of Hong Kong
P&O (company)
Chairmen of HSBC
20th-century Scottish businesspeople
British people in British Hong Kong